Sidney Poitier  (February 20, 1927 – January 6, 2022) was a Bahamian and American actor, film director, and diplomat. In 1964, he was the first black actor and first Bahamian to win the Academy Award for Best Actor. He received two competitive Golden Globe Awards, a competitive British Academy of Film and Television Arts award (BAFTA), and a Grammy Award for Best Spoken Word Album. Poitier was one of the last major stars from the Golden Age of Hollywood cinema.

Poitier's family lived in the Bahamas, then still a Crown colony, but he was born unexpectedly in Miami, Florida, while they were visiting, which automatically granted him U.S. citizenship. He grew up in the Bahamas, but moved to Miami at age 15, and to New York City when he was 16. He joined the American Negro Theatre, landing his breakthrough film role as a high school student in the film Blackboard Jungle (1955). In 1958, Poitier starred with Tony Curtis as chained-together escaped convicts in The Defiant Ones, which received nine Academy Award nominations; both actors received nominations for Best Actor, with Poitier's being the first for a Black actor.  They both also had Best Actor nominations for the BAFTAs, with Poitier winning. Additionally Poitier won the Silver Bear for Best Actor for his performance in the film. In 1964, he won the Academy Award and the Golden Globe for Best Actor for Lilies of the Field (1963), playing an itinerant handyman helping a group of German-speaking nuns build a chapel.

Poitier also received acclaim for Porgy and Bess (1959), A Raisin in the Sun (1961), and A Patch of Blue (1965), because of his strong roles as epic African American male characters. He continued to break ground in three successful 1967 films which dealt with issues of race and race relations: To Sir, with Love; Guess Who's Coming to Dinner, and In the Heat of the Night, the latter of which won the Academy Award for Best Picture for that year. He received Golden Globe and BAFTA nominations for his performance in the last film, and in a poll the next year he was voted the US's top box-office star. Beginning in the 1970s, Poitier also directed various comedy films, including Stir Crazy (1980), starring Richard Pryor and Gene Wilder, among other films. After nearly a decade away from acting, he returned to television and film starring in Shoot to Kill (1988) and Sneakers (1992).

Poitier was granted a knighthood by Queen Elizabeth II in 1974. In 1982, he received the Golden Globe Cecil B. DeMille Award. In 1995, he received the Kennedy Center Honor. From 1997 to 2007, he was the Bahamian Ambassador to Japan. In 1999, he ranked 22nd among male actors on the "100 Years...100 Stars" list by the American Film Institute and received the Screen Actors Guild Life Achievement Award. In 2002, he was given an Honorary Academy Award, in recognition of his "remarkable accomplishments as an artist and as a human being". In 2009, he was awarded the Presidential Medal of Freedom, the highest civilian honor in the United States, by President Barack Obama. In 2016, he was awarded the BAFTA Fellowship for outstanding lifetime achievement in film.

Early life
Sidney Poitier was born on February 20, 1927, in Miami, Florida. He was the youngest of seven children born to Evelyn and Reginald James Poitier, Afro-Bahamian farmers who owned a farm on Cat Island. The family would travel to Miami to sell tomatoes and other produce to wholesalers. His father also worked as a cab driver in Nassau. Poitier was born unexpectedly in Miami while his parents were there on business; his birth was two months premature, and he was not expected to survive, but his parents remained in Miami for three months to nurse him to health. Poitier grew up in the Bahamas, then a British Crown colony. His birth in the United States entitled him to US citizenship.

Some believe that the Poitier ancestors had migrated from Haiti, and were probably among the runaway slaves who established maroon communities throughout the Bahamas, including Cat Island. Poitier was originally a French name, and there were then no Poitiers of French ancestry nearby in the Bahamas. However, there  been a Poitier of French ancestry on Cat Island—the name came from planter Charles Leonard Poitier, who had immigrated from Jamaica in the early 1800s. In 1834, his wife's estate on Cat Island had 86 slaves of West African origin who kept the name Poitier, a name that had been introduced into the Anglosphere since the Norman Conquest in the eleventh century. Charles Leonard Poitier might have been from Haiti originally but had lived in Jamaica previously.

Poitier lived with his family on Cat Island until he was ten, when they moved to Nassau. There he was exposed to the modern world, where he saw his first automobile and first experienced electricity, plumbing, refrigeration, and motion pictures. He was raised Catholic but later became an agnostic with views closer to deism.

At age fifteen, he was sent to Miami to live with his brother's large family, but Poitier found it impossible to adjust to the racism in Jim Crow era Florida. At sixteen, he moved to New York City, looking to become an actor, holding a string of jobs as a dishwasher in the meantime. After failing his first audition with the American Negro Theatre due to his inability to fluently read the script, an elderly Jewish waiter sat with him every night for several weeks, helping him to improve his reading by using the newspaper. During World War II, in November 1943, he lied about his age and enlisted in the Army. He was assigned to a Veteran's Administration hospital in Northport, New York, and was trained to work with psychiatric patients. Poitier became upset with how the hospital treated its patients and feigned mental illness to obtain a discharge. Poitier confessed to a psychiatrist that he was faking his condition, but the doctor was sympathetic and granted his discharge under Section VIII of Army regulation 615–360 in December 1944.

After leaving the Army, he worked as a dishwasher until a successful audition landed him a role in an American Negro Theatre production, the same company he failed his first audition with.

Career

Early work and blacklist
Poitier joined the American Negro Theater but was rejected by audiences. Contrary to what was expected of black actors at the time, Poitier's tone deafness made him unable to sing. Determined to refine his acting skills and rid himself of his noticeable Bahamian accent, he spent the next six months dedicating himself to achieving theatrical success. He modeled his legendary speech pattern after radio personality Norman Brokenshire. On his second attempt at the theater, he was noticed and given a leading role in the Broadway production of Lysistrata, through which, though it ran a failing four days, he received an invitation to understudy for Anna Lucasta.

In 1947, Poitier was a founding member of the Committee for the Negro in the Arts (CNA), an organization whose participants were committed to a left-wing analysis of class and racial exploitation. Among his other CNA-related activities, in the early 1950s he was a Vice Chair of the organization. In 1952, he was one of several narrators in a pageant written by Alice Childress and Lorraine Hansberry for the Negro History Festival put on by the leftist Harlem monthly newspaper Freedom.

His participation in such events and CNA generally, along with his friendships with other leftist Black performers, including Canada Lee and Paul Robeson, led to his subsequent blacklisting for a few years. Even associating with Poitier added to the basis for blacklisting Alfred Palca, the writer and producer of one of Poitier's earliest films, the 1954 Go Man Go.

Poitier never did sign a loyalty oath, despite being asked in connection with his prospective role in Blackboard Jungle (1955).

1950s

By late 1949, Poitier had to choose between leading roles on stage and an offer to work for Darryl F. Zanuck in the film No Way Out (1950). His performance in No Way Out, as a doctor treating a white bigot (played by Richard Widmark, who became a friend), was noticed and led to more roles, each considerably more interesting and more prominent than those most African-American actors of the time were offered. In 1951, he traveled to South Africa with the African-American actor Canada Lee to star in the film version of Cry, the Beloved Country. Poitier's distinction continued in his role as Gregory W. Miller, a member of an incorrigible high-school class in Blackboard Jungle (1955). But it was his performance in Martin Ritt's 1957 film Edge of the City that the industry could not ignore. It was a pitch towards stardom granted him.

Poitier enjoyed working for director William Wellman on Good-bye, My Lady (1956). Wellman was a big name, he had previously directed the famous Roxie Hart (1942) with Ginger Rogers and Magic Town (1947) with James Stewart. What Poitier remembered indelibly was the wonderful humanity in this talented director. Wellman had a sensitivity that Poitier thought was profound, which Wellman felt he needed to hide." Poitier later praised Wellman for inspiring his thoughtful approach to directing when he found himself taking the helm from Joseph Sargent on Buck and the Preacher in 1971.

In 1958 he starred alongside Tony Curtis in director Stanley Kramer's The Defiant Ones. The film was a critical and commercial success with the performances of both Poitier and Curtis being praised. The film landed eight Academy Award nominations including Best Picture and Best Actor nominations for both stars, making Poitier the first Black male actor to be nominated for a competitive Academy Award as best actor. Poitier did win the British Academy Film Award for Best Foreign Actor.

Poitier acted in the first production of A Raisin in the Sun alongside Ruby Dee on the Broadway stage at the Ethel Barrymore Theatre in 1959. The play was directed by Lloyd Richards. The play introduced details of Black life to the overwhelmingly White Broadway audiences, while director Richards observed that it was the first play to which large numbers of Black people were drawn. The play was a groundbreaking piece of American theater with Frank Rich, critic from The New York Times writing in 1983, that A Raisin in the Sun "changed American theater forever". For his performance he earned a Tony Award for Best Actor in a Play nomination. That same year Poitier would star in the film adaptation of Porgy and Bess (1959) alongside Dorothy Dandridge. For his performance, Poitier received a 1960 Golden Globe Award nomination for Best Actor in a Motion Picture Musical or Comedy.

1960s

In 1961, Poitier starred in the film adaptation of A Raisin in the Sun for which he received another Golden Globe Award nomination. Also in 1961, Poitier starred in Paris Blues alongside Paul Newman, Joanne Woodward, Louis Armstrong, and Diahann Carroll. The film dealt with the American racism of the time by contrasting it with Paris's open acceptance of Black people. In 1963 he starred in Lilies of the Field. For this role, he won the Academy Award for Best Actor and became the first Black male to win the award. His satisfaction at this honor was undermined by his concerns that this award was more of the industry congratulating itself for having him as a token and it would inhibit him from asking for more substantive considerations afterward. Poitier worked relatively little over the following year; he remained the only major actor of African descent and the roles offered were predominantly typecast as a soft-spoken appeaser.

In 1964, Poitier recorded an album with the composer Fred Katz called Poitier Meets Plato, in which Poitier recites passages from Plato's writings. He also performed in the Cold War drama The Bedford Incident (1965) alongside the film's producer Richard Widmark, the Biblical epic film The Greatest Story Ever Told (1965) alongside Charlton Heston and Max von Sydow, and A Patch of Blue (1965) co-starring Elizabeth Hartman and Shelley Winters.

In 1967, he was the most successful draw at the box office, the commercial peak of his career, with three popular films, To Sir, with Love, and In the Heat of the Night, and Guess Who's Coming to Dinner. Although these three films seemingly shared little similarity, they all, albeit not overtly, dealt with the black and white divide.

In To Sir, with Love, Poitier plays a teacher at a secondary school in the East End of London. The film deals with social and racial issues in the inner city school. The film was met with mixed response; however, Poitier was praised for his performance, with the critic from Time writing, "Even the weak moments are saved by Poitier, who invests his role with a subtle warmth."

In Norman Jewison's mystery drama In the Heat of the Night, Poitier played Virgil Tibbs, a police detective from Philadelphia who investigates a murder in the deep south in Mississippi alongside a cop with racial prejudices played by Rod Steiger. The film was a critical success with Bosley Crowther of The New York Times calling it "the most powerful film I have seen in a long time." Roger Ebert placed it at number ten on his top ten list of 1967 films. Art Murphy of Variety felt that the excellent Poitier and outstanding Steiger performances overcame noteworthy flaws, including an uneven script. Poitier received a Golden Globe Award and British Academy Film Award nomination for his performance.

In Stanley Kramer's social drama Guess Who's Coming to Dinner, Poitier played a man in a relationship with a White woman played by Katharine Houghton. The film revolves around her bringing him to meet with her parents played by Katharine Hepburn and Spencer Tracy. The film was one of the rare films at the time to depict an interracial romance in a positive light, as interracial marriage historically had been illegal in most states of the United States. It was still illegal in 17 states—mostly Southern states—until June 12, 1967, six months before the film was released. The film was a critical and financial success. In his film review, Roger Ebert described Poitier's character as "a noble, rich, intelligent, handsome, ethical medical expert" and that the film "is a magnificent piece of entertainment. It will make you laugh and may even make you cry." To win his role as Dr. Prentice in the film, Poitier had to audition for Tracy and Hepburn at two separate dinner parties.

Poitier began to be criticized for being typecast as over-idealized African-American characters who were not permitted to have any sexuality or personality faults, such as his character in Guess Who's Coming to Dinner. Poitier was aware of this pattern himself but was conflicted on the matter. He wanted more varied roles; but he also felt obliged to set an example with his characters, by challenging old stereotypes, as he was the only major actor of African descent being cast in leading roles in the American film industry at the time. For instance, in 1966, he turned down an opportunity to play the lead in an NBC television production of Othello with that spirit in mind. Despite this, many of the films in which Poitier starred during the 1960s would later be cited as social thrillers by both filmmakers and critics.

1970s
In the Heat of the Night featured his most successful character, Virgil Tibbs, a Philadelphia, Pennsylvania, detective whose subsequent career was the subject of two sequels: They Call Me Mister Tibbs! (1970) and The Organization (1971).

In 1972 he made his feature film directorial debut, the Western Buck and the Preacher, in which Poitier also starred, alongside Harry Belafonte and Ruby Dee. Poitier replaced the original director, Joseph Sargent. The following year he directed his second feature, the romantic drama A Warm December. Poitier also starred in the film alongside Esther Anderson.

During the 1970s, Poitier directed several financially successful comedy films, including three in which he also starred: Uptown Saturday Night (1974) with Bill Cosby and Harry Belafonte; and Let's Do It Again (1975) and A Piece of the Action (1977), both with Cosby. His most successful comedy was Stir Crazy (1980), starring Richard Pryor and Gene Wilder, which for many years was the highest-grossing film directed by a person of African descent.

Later career 

In 1985, he directed Fast Forward and, in 1990, he reunited with Cosby directing him in the family comedy Ghost Dad.

In 1988, he starred in Shoot to Kill with Tom Berenger. In 1992, he starred in Sneakers with Robert Redford and Dan Aykroyd. In 1997, he co-starred in The Jackal with Richard Gere and Bruce Willis. In the 1990s, he starred in several well received television movies and miniseries such as Separate but Equal (1991), To Sir, with Love II (1996), Mandela and de Klerk (1997), and The Simple Life of Noah Dearborn (1999). He received Emmy nominations for his work in Separate but Equal and Mandela and de Klerk, as well as a Golden Globe nomination for the former.  He won a Grammy Award for Best Spoken Word Album in 2001.

In 2002, Poitier received the 2001 Honorary Academy Award for his overall contribution to American cinema. Later in the ceremony, Denzel Washington won the award for Best Actor for his performance in Training Day, becoming the second Black actor to win the award. In his victory speech, Washington saluted Poitier by saying "I'll always be chasing you, Sidney. I'll always be following in your footsteps. There's nothing I would rather do, sir."

With the death of Ernest Borgnine in 2012, Poitier became the oldest living recipient of the Academy Award for Best Actor. On March 2, 2014, Poitier appeared with Angelina Jolie at the 86th Academy Awards to present the Best Director Award. He was given a standing ovation and Jolie thanked him for all his Hollywood contributions, stating: "We are in your debt." Poitier gave a brief speech, telling his peers to "keep up the wonderful work" to warm applause. In 2021, the academy dedicated the lobby of the new Academy Museum of Motion Pictures in Los Angeles as the "Sidney Poitier Grand Lobby" in his honor.

Board and diplomatic service
From 1995 to 2003, Poitier served as a member of the board of directors of The Walt Disney Company.

In April 1997, Poitier was appointed ambassador from the Bahamas to Japan, a position he held until 2007. From 2002 to 2007, he was concurrently the ambassador of the Bahamas to UNESCO.

Personal life

Poitier was first married to Juanita Hardy from April 29, 1950, until 1965. Though Poitier became a resident of Mount Vernon in Westchester County, New York in 1956, they raised their family in Stuyvesant, New York, in a house on the Hudson River. In 1959, Poitier began a nine-year affair with actress Diahann Carroll. He married Joanna Shimkus, a Canadian actress who starred with Poitier in The Lost Man in 1969, on January 23, 1976, and they remained married until his death. He had four daughters with his first wife (Beverly, Pamela, Sherri, and Gina) and two with his second (Anika and Sydney Tamiia). In addition to his six daughters, Poitier had eight grandchildren and three great-grandchildren. When Hurricane Dorian hit the Bahamas in September 2019, Poitier's family had 23 missing relatives.

Death
On January 6, 2022, Poitier died at his home in Beverly Hills, California, at the age of 94. His death was confirmed by Fred Mitchell, the Minister of Foreign Affairs of the Bahamas. According to a copy of his death certificate obtained by TMZ, the cause of death was cardiopulmonary failure, with Alzheimer's disease and prostate cancer listed as underlying causes.

Upon Poitier's death, many released statements honoring him, including President Joe Biden, who wrote in part: "With unflinching grandeur and poise – his singular warmth, depth, and stature on-screen – Sidney helped open the hearts of millions and changed the way America saw itself." Former president Barack Obama paid tribute to Poitier, calling him "a singular talent who epitomized dignity and grace". Michelle Obama, Bill Clinton and Hillary Clinton also released statements.

Many in the entertainment industry also paid tribute to Poitier, including Martin Scorsese who wrote, "For years, the spotlight was on Sidney Poitier. He had a vocal precision and physical power and grace that at moments seemed almost supernatural." Harry Belafonte, Morgan Freeman, Viola Davis, Whoopi Goldberg, Lupita Nyong'o, Halle Berry, Ava DuVernay, Oprah Winfrey, Octavia Spencer, Jeffrey Wright, Giancarlo Esposito, Quincy Jones, Michael Eisner, Ron Howard and others also paid tribute. Broadway paid tribute when its theaters dimmed their lights on January 19, 2022, at 7:45 pm ET.

The Ebertfest film festival announced it would be dedicating their 2022 event to the memory of Poitier and Gilbert Gottfried.

Filmography

Awards and honors

Poitier became the first Black actor to win the Academy Award for Best Actor for Lilies of the Field (1963). He also received a Grammy Award, two Golden Globe Awards, and a British Academy Film Award. He received numerous honoraries during his lifetime including the Academy Honorary Award for his lifetime achievement in film in 2001. In 1992, Poitier received the AFI Life Achievement Award. In 1994, Poitier received a star on the Hollywood Walk of Fame. In 1981, he received the Golden Globe Cecil B. DeMille Award and in 2016 he received the BAFTA Fellowship.

In 1995, he received the Kennedy Center Honor and in 2009, Poitier was awarded the Presidential Medal of Freedom from Barack Obama. He was also named an honorary Knight Commander of the Order of the British Empire by Queen Elizabeth II in 1974. In 1986, he gave the Commencement Address to the University of Miami graduating class and was given the Honorary Degree of Doctor of Fine Arts.

Legacy

Poitier was described as an icon in his obituary by USA Today. Laura Jacobs for Vanity Fair hailed Poitier as the "Martin Luther King Jr. of the movies". Several film historians and journalists have called him Hollywood's first African-American film star. The New York Times noted after his death, that Poitier was instrumental for the diversity of Hollywood and "paved the way for Black actors in film". The Hollywood Reporter wrote that "Poitier was the first actor to star in mainstream Hollywood movies that depicted a Black man in a non-stereotypical fashion, and his influence, especially during the 1950s and '60s as role model and image-maker, was immeasurable."

While presenting Poitier the Honorary Academy Award in 2002, Denzel Washington said of Poitier: "Before Sidney, African American actors had to take supporting roles in major studio films that were easy to cut out in certain parts of the country. But you couldn't cut Sidney Poitier out of a Sidney Poitier picture". He was an influential African-American actor and highly viewed as such as he became the first Black actor to be nominated for an Academy Award and the first Black male actor to win the award. He was also described as the "sole representative" of African-Americans in mainstream cinema during the 1950s and 1960s, especially during the height of the American Civil Rights movement. The New York Times noted that Poitier was "an ambassador to white America and a benign emblem of Black power". For his role in diversifying Hollywood and for his role in paving the way for further Black actors, he was described as one of "the most important figures of 20th century Hollywood".

Former president of the United States Barack Obama noted that Poitier had "[advanced] the nation's dialogue on race and respect" and "opened doors for a generation of actors".

Sidney, a documentary film about Poitier's life and legacy by Reginald Hudlin, was  released on September 23, 2022.

Works about Poitier
Autobiographies
Poitier wrote three autobiographical books:
 This Life (1980)
 The Measure of a Man: A Spiritual Autobiography (2000)
 Life Beyond Measure: Letters to My Great-Granddaughter (2008, an Oprah's Book Club selection)

Biographies
 Sidney Poitier: Man, Actor, Icon (2004) by historian Aram Goudsouzian.
 Sidney Poitier Black and White: Sidney Poitier's Emergence in the 1960s as a Black Icon (2020) by Philip Powers.

Other works

Poitier wrote the novel Montaro Caine (2013).

Documentaries
 Sidney Poitier: One Bright Light (2000)
 Sidney Poitier, un outsider à Hollywood (2008)
 Sidney (2022)

See also
 David Hampton, an impostor who posed as Poitier's son "David" in 1983, which inspired the 1990 play and 1993 film Six Degrees of Separation
 John Stewart, a superhero whose original design was based on Poitier

Notes

References

External links

 Official publisher web page
 Poitier breaks new ground with Oscar win (BBC News, April 13, 1964)
 The Purpose Prize: Sidney Poitier
 To Sir With Honors (Washington Post, December 3, 1995)
 Overview of Sidney Poitier's life
 
 Artist of the Month: Sidney Poitier at Hyena Productions
 Sidney Poitier films ranked from worst to best
 Image of Sidney Poitier holding his Oscar alongside Gregory Peck, Annabella and Anne Bancroft backstage at the Academy Awards, Los Angeles, 1964. Los Angeles Times Photographic Archive (Collection 1429). UCLA Library Special Collections, Charles E. Young Research Library, University of California, Los Angeles.

1927 births
2022 deaths
20th-century American male actors
20th-century American male writers
20th-century American non-fiction writers
21st-century American male actors
21st-century American male writers
21st-century American non-fiction writers
AFI Life Achievement Award recipients
Academy Honorary Award recipients
Actors awarded knighthoods
African-American agnostics
African-American film directors
African-American history of Westchester County, New York
African-American male actors
African-American non-fiction writers
American autobiographers
American deists
American film directors
American film producers
American male film actors
American male non-fiction writers
American male stage actors
American male television actors
American people of Bahamian descent
BAFTA fellows
Bahamian diplomats
Ambassadors of the Bahamas to Japan
Bahamian film directors
Bahamian male film actors
Bahamian people of American descent
Best Actor Academy Award winners
Best Drama Actor Golden Globe (film) winners
Best Foreign Actor BAFTA Award winners
Cecil B. DeMille Award Golden Globe winners
Child soldiers in World War II
Combat medics
Commandeurs of the Ordre des Arts et des Lettres
Deaths from Alzheimer's disease
Deaths from cancer in California
Deaths from prostate cancer
Directors of The Walt Disney Company
Fellows of the American Academy of Arts and Sciences
Former Roman Catholics
Grammy Award winners
Honorary Knights Commander of the Order of the British Empire
Kennedy Center honorees
Male actors from Miami
Male actors from New York City
Military personnel from Florida
Deaths from dementia in California
People from Cat Island, Bahamas
People from Nassau, Bahamas
Permanent Delegates of the Bahamas to UNESCO
Presidential Medal of Freedom recipients
Silver Bear for Best Actor winners
Television producers from New York City
United States Army personnel of World War II
United States Army soldiers
Writers from Miami